The Young Ladies' Academy of Philadelphia was the first government recognized institution established for women's higher education in the United States. Located on Cherry Street, between Third and Fourth Streets, and founded by John Poor on June 4, 1787, it was chartered on January 7, 1792. It provided young women with a diverse curriculum, notably teaching students about various components of English, science, arithmetic, history, and geography.

Historical context  
Founded in the late 18th century, shortly after the conclusion of the American Revolutionary War, the academy was established during a period of American history when women were expected to engage in Republican Motherhood. Historians often cite Republican Motherhood as the reason women's education rose to prominence in the early Republic. Due to the idea that women were to educate members of their household on concepts of virtue, access to education for women gained broader support. However, women who embodied Republican Motherhood were restricted in the scope of their education; their learning was supposed to focus on serving home and family, that is, the domestic sphere. Historian Margaret Nash describes access to women's education in the early Republic as a means to spreading knowledge to the greater society as a whole, rather than as an end for women themselves.

Benjamin Rush, and many other contemporaries, viewed the academy as an institution established to promote these ideas of Republican Motherhood. Rush believed that women's education ought to be practical for domestic tasks, as well as include traditional academic disciplines such as history and geography. Indeed, in a speech to visitors of the academy, Rush noted that maintaining the wellness of the young Republic and promoting the values of each citizen being equally entitled to liberty "make[s] it necessary that our ladies should be qualified to a certain degree by a peculiar and suitable education, to concur in instructing their sons in the principles of liberty and government."   He himself taught a chemistry course at the academy.

History 
During and after the American Revolution, Philadelphia was well situated as a location for the school as a significant cultural center in the United States. John Poor, founder and Harvard graduate, was the original principal of the institution. Students came from many different areas of the United States and originally held the understanding that they were "scholars" and had an opportunity only afforded to the elite. However, daughters of immigrants and less wealthy students attended the school starting around 1794, perhaps to learn skills to be economically self-sufficient rather than to teach members of the household as expected of Republican Motherhood. The school had a board of "gentlemen visitors," who presented students with awards based upon their performance in an academic discipline or for good behavior, which was awarded to students who displayed proper manners and a mild temperament. Prizes for excellence fueled the school's competitive nature, which mirrored the atmosphere of boy's academies of the time. No other girls' school was granted a charter until 1829, but the academy served as a precursor to hundreds of academies established widely throughout the Republic.

Further reading
Kelley, Mary. Learning to Stand and Speak: Women, Education, and Public Life in America's Republic. University of North Carolina Press, 2006.
Lerna, Gerder. The Female Experience: An American Documentary. Oxford: Oxford University Press, 1992.

Rush, Benjamin. "Thoughts on Female Education." Speech, Philadelphia, Pennsylvania, July 28, 1787. Accessed November 8, 2018.
Woody, Thomas. A History of Women's Education in the United States. New York, Octagon Books, 1966.

References 

Universities and colleges in Philadelphia
1787 establishments in Pennsylvania
Educational institutions established in 1787
Women's education in the United States
Female seminaries in the United States
History of women in Pennsylvania